Boort Secondary College is a state secondary college located in the town of Boort which is located next to Lake Boort, in the Shire of Loddon.

About the school
Boort Secondary College is a Year 7-12 college

Like most rural schools, Boort High School is designated a school which is under-represented in the university undergraduate population, and its students can apply for special eligibility. Additionally, universities such as Flinders University, offer bonus points for university access to students from rural and isolated areas.

History
The school was founded as Boort High School.

References

External links
School Website

Public high schools in Victoria (Australia)